Non-tax revenue or non-tax receipts are government revenue not generated from taxes. For example - bond issues and profits of state-owned companies.

Examples 
 Aid from another level of government (intragovernmental aid): in the United States, federal grants may be considered non-tax revenue for the receiving states, and equalization payments
 Aid from abroad (foreign aid)
 Tribute or indemnities paid by a weaker state to a stronger one, often as a condition of peace after suffering military defeat. The war reparations paid by the defeated Central Powers after the First World War offer a well-known example.
 Loans, or other borrowing, from monetary funds and/or other governments
 Revenue from state-owned enterprises (for example, revenue from Public Sector Unions)
 Revenue (including interest or profit) from investment funds (collective investment schemes), sovereign wealth funds, Investment or endowments, .
 Revenues from sales of state assets
 Rents, concessions, and royalties collected by the state when it contracts out the right to profit from some good or service to a private corporation. An example are contracts for resource extraction (for such natural resources as minerals, timber, petroleum and natural gas, or marine resources) collected privately under license from state-owned lands
 Fines collected and assets forfeitured as a penalty. Examples include parking fines, court costs levied on criminal offenders 

 Fees for the granting regulates or issuance of permits or licenses. Examples include vehicle registration plate permits, vehicle registration fees, watercraft registration fees, building fees, driver's licenses, hunting and fishing licenses, fees for professional licensing, fees for visas or passports, fees for demolition, rezoning, and land grading (which causes silt), and sometimes for increasing stormwater runoff, destroying native vegetation, and cutting-down healthy trees.
 User fees collected in exchange for the use of many public services and facilities. Tolls charged for the use of toll roads are an example
 Donations and voluntary contributions to the state

The volatility of non-tax revenue 

Non-tax revenues can fluctuate significantly from one year to another. Indeed, their value is correlated with changing economic circumstances, repayments and interest on loans may be renegotiated, a record fine in the field of competition can significantly vary the profits of fines and penalties.  Moreover, some years are marked by exceptional events: for example, in France in 2012, the sale of "4G" radio frequencies resulted in the collection of nearly €1.3 billion in non-tax revenues.

References 

 https://www.performance-publique.budget.gouv.fr/budget-comptes-etat/budget-etat/approfondir/recettes-etat/recettes-non-fiscales#.XpszoNMzZ0t
Fiscal policy